Washington Square is an American park in the North Beach district of San Francisco. It was established in 1847 and is one of the city's first parks. The park is bordered by sidewalk cafes and restaurants such as Mama's (restaurant), Park Tavern restaurant and the Liguria Bakery as well as the Sts. Peter and Paul Church.

History 
In the 19th century, the area was used by the Mexican rancher Juana Briones to grow potatoes and raise cattle, before it was designated a city square in 1847 when surveyor Jasper O'Farrell laid out San Francisco's street grid. It became an unofficial dump next to a cemetery, but by the 1860s, it hosted Fourth of July celebrations, and later Columbus Day celebrations and Italian festivals.

Originally, it was a complete rectangle, all the way to Powell Street. But in 1873–1875, the City built Columbus Avenue, then known as Montgomery, cutting through the Square. The avenue was built, evidently, because business and banking interests in the Financial District wanted greater interaction with North Beach, which was isolated, geographically, by the hills, the Barbary Coast, and Chinatown.

Washington Square was a place of refuge for many fires on Telegraph Hill, notably in 1894 and 1901. It was home for a year for some 600 people who lived in wooden barracks and Army tents after the 1906 earthquake and fire.

Ben Franklin statue

The Base of the statue is a Temperance fountain donated in 1879 by Temperance crusader Henry D. Cogswell

Marini Plaza
Separated from the main park by Columbus Avenue, Marini Plaza is a tiny park at the corner of  Powell Street and Union Street, named after civic benefactor Frank Marini (1862-1952).

Committee to Beautify
In the 1950s, a coalition of community groups, the Committee to Beautify Washington Square, spearheaded the effort to redesign the square, eliminating the paths that criss-crossed the park. Landscape architects Francis McCarthy and Douglas Baylis put Lombardy poplar trees in the center of a grassy expanse encircled by paths lined with benches, the configuration we have today; although Lawrence Halprin is often credited with the design, his plans exceeded the available budget. In 1958, the city tried to solve the parking problem by putting a parking garage under the square, a plan that was defeated then but resurfaced periodically until the park was granted landmark status in 2000.

Popular culture
Washington Square has been featured in many feature films. Director Don Siegel features the church and the square in scenes from the 1971 movie, Dirty Harry. The church, and nearby Dante Building, are the setting of sniper attacks by the "Scorpio Killer". The park and surrounding area is also featured in the 2000 film, Bedazzled.

Many chapters in Richard Brautigan's 1967 novel Trout Fishing in America take place in Washington Square. It was also the setting for Lawrence Ferlinghetti's 1979 poem The Old Italians Dying.

Gallery

References

External links
 Washington Square | San Francisco Recreation and Park

See also

List of San Francisco Designated Landmarks

Parks in San Francisco
North Beach, San Francisco
Squares in San Francisco
San Francisco Designated Landmarks
1847 establishments in Alta California